William Nathanial Davenport (November 3, 1856 – January 28, 1933) was a Massachusetts  politician who served in both branches of the Massachusetts legislature,  and as the fourth Mayor of Marlborough, Massachusetts.

Biography
Davenport was born in Boylston, Massachusetts, on November 3, 1856 as the son of Almira J. Howard and William J. Davenport. He attended law school at the University of Michigan in Ann Arbor, Michigan. In 1887, Davenport married Elizabeth Moore "Lizzie" Kendall (1862–1957). They lived in Marlborough and Worcester, Massachusetts.

Professional career
Davenport was admitted to the Michigan Bar in 1882  and the Massachusetts Bar in 1883. From 1886-1887, Davenport served as a member of the Massachusetts House of Representatives. In 1887, he succeeded John O'Connell as the fourth Mayor of Marlborough, Massachusetts. Following his tenure as mayor, Davenport was elected to the Massachusetts Senate as a member of the 110th Massachusetts General Court.

See also
 110th Massachusetts General Court (1889)

References

1856 births
1933 deaths
Republican Party Massachusetts state senators
People from Boylston, Massachusetts
Republican Party members of the Massachusetts House of Representatives
Mayors of Marlborough, Massachusetts
Michigan lawyers
Massachusetts lawyers
University of Michigan Law School alumni